Rachakonda Police commissionerate is one among the three Police commissionerates located in Hyderabad, Telangana, India.

History
It was formed in June 2016 by bifurcating Cyberabad Metropolitan Police, earlier it was known as Cyberabad East.

Current Structure
Currently Rachakonda Police Commissionerate has three DCP zones.

Malkajgiri DCP Zone

Malkajgiri ACP Zone
Malkajgiri
Nacharam
Uppal
Medipally
Ghatkesar

Kushaiguda Sub Division
Kushaiguda
Neredmet
Jawahar Nagar
Keesara

LB Nagar DCP Zone

LB Nagar ACP Zone
 LB Nagar
 Saroornagar
 Chaitanyapuri
 Women PS

Vanasthalipuram ACP Zone
 Vanasthalipuram
 Meerpet
 Hayathnagar
 Abdullapurmet
 Pahadishareef
 Balapur

Ibrahimpatnam ACP Zone
 Ibrahimpatnam
 Manchal
 Yacharam
 Maheshwaram
 Kandukur
 Adibatla
 Madgul

Bhuvanagiri DCP Zone

Bhuvanagiri ACP Zone
 Bhuvanagiri Town
 Women PS, Bhuvanagiri
 Bhuvanagiri Circle
 Bhuvanagiri Rural
 Bommalaramaram
 Bibinagar

Yadadri ACP Zone
 Yadadri
 Yadagirigutta Circle
 Turkapally
 Rajapeta
 Alair
 Motakondur

Choutuppal ACP Zone
 Choutuppal
 Choutuppal Circle
 Pochampally
 Narayanapur
 Ramannapet Circle
 Ramannapet
 Valigonda
 Athmakur
 Mothkur
 Addaguduru

References

Sources
 Cyberabad East police renamed as Rachakonda commissionerate
 Cyberabad police commissionerate divided into East and West
 Over 3K CCTVs to be put up in Rachakonda Commissionerate
 Anit-Trafficking Unit inaugurated at Rachakonda Commissionerate

Hanamkonda district
Telangana Police
2016 establishments in Telangana
Government agencies established in 2016